Parachalciope monoplaneta is a moth of the family Noctuidae first described by George Hampson in 1913. It is found in the Democratic Republic of the Congo, Uganda and Rwanda.

References

Catocalinae
Insects of Uganda
Moths of Africa